Catocala dotatoides is a moth of the family Erebidae first described by Robert W. Poole in 1989. It is found in India.

References

Moths described in 1989
dotatoides
Moths of Asia